Peter Petersen (5 May 1892 – 27 August 1964) was a Danish sports shooter. He competed at the 1920 Summer Olympics and the 1924 Summer Olympics.

References

External links
 

1892 births
1964 deaths
Danish male sport shooters
Olympic shooters of Denmark
Shooters at the 1920 Summer Olympics
Shooters at the 1924 Summer Olympics
People from Vejen Municipality
Sportspeople from the Region of Southern Denmark